Scott Matthews is an English singer-songwriter from Wolverhampton, England.

His first album Passing Stranger was released on 13 March 2006 on San Remo Records before being re-released on Island Records later in the year. Janice Long was the first of the BBC DJs to play his music.  Soon, tracks from Passing Stranger were also being played by Mark Radcliffe and Bob Harris on BBC Radio 2. In April, Scott played sessions on BBC Radio 2 & BBC 6 Music.

Matthews' first single "Elusive" was released in September. The single received much airplay from BBC Radio DJs Jo Whiley, Dermot O'Leary, and Zane Lowe.  Between 7–10 August, Lowe played "Elusive" once each night as his chosen Single of the Week.  Matthews also visited the station to perform "Elusive" and other songs from the album in May and August 2006.  In May 2007, he won the Ivor Novello Award for "Best Song Musically and Lyrically" for "Elusive".

Matthews has toured the UK extensively in support of his album and appeared in support of the Foo Fighters for their acoustic Skin and Bones concerts around the country in June 2006.

Matthews' second album Elsewhere was produced by Matthews and Gavin Monaghan and released on Island Records.

His third album, What the Night Delivers, was produced by Jon Cotton.

Home Part 1 is the fourth studio release from Matthews. The album is the first to be recorded entirely by Matthews in his home studio. What the Night Delivers features guest performances by double bassist Danny Thompson (whom Matthews met whilst performing in Joe Boyd’s stage production of Way to Blue-The Songs of Nick Drake) and regular contributing musicians, Sam Martin, Danny Keane and Scott's brother, Darren Matthews who plays piano on two tracks; "The Clearing" and "The Night is Young".

The album was followed by Home Part 2 in September 2016, released via Scott's own label Shedio Records. Tracks include "Black Country Boy", the title of which references the Black Country region of the West Midlands. The album was produced by Scott.

Discography

Albums
 Passing Stranger (2006) No. 45 UK Albums Chart
 Elsewhere (2009) Released 25 May 2009
 Live in London (2010) Released November 2010
 What The Night Delivers (2011) Released 5 September 2011
 Home (Part 1) (2014) Released November 2014
 Home Part 2 (2016) Released September 2016
 The Great Untold (2018) Released April 2018
 New Skin (2020) Released December 2020

Singles

Other contributions
The Saturday Sessions: The Dermot O'Leary Show (2007, EMI) – "Boy With the Thorn in His Side"

References

External links
Scott Matthews' Official site

1976 births
Living people
English male singer-songwriters
English folk singers
English folk guitarists
musicians from Wolverhampton
Ivor Novello Award winners